Language-Sensitive Editor (LSE) is a full-screen visual editor for the VAX/VMS and OpenVMS Operating systems. LSE is implemented by using the Text Processing Utility (TPU) language. It is part of the DECset programming tool set, which also contains a test manager, the performance and coverage analyzer (PCA), a code management system (CMS), and a module management mystem (MMS).

Features
LSE requires the features of a VT100 terminal and successors, or a compatible terminal emulator. It has the following features:
 Syntax templates for a number of programming languages, which can be modified or extended by the user.
 Windowing support.
 Compilation and debug within editor.
 Programmable editing functions.
 EDT  keypad layout default.

Languages
As shipped in 1999 LSE came with templates for the following programming languages:
 DEC Ada
 DEC BASIC
 DEC C
 DEC C++
 VAX COBOL
 DIGITAL Fortran
 DEC PASCAL
 VAX BLISS-32
 VAX C
 VAX MACRO
 DEC PL/I

As of 2007 the following additional templates were supplied:
 Kednos PL/I for OpenVMS
 VAX ADA
 VAX BASIC
 VAX BLISS
 VAX CDD/Plus
 DEC COBOL
 VAX Datatrieve
 DEC DATATRIEVE
 VAX DIBOL
 VAX DOCUMENT
 VAX FORTRAN
 MACRO-64
 VAX SCAN

References

External links
 

OpenVMS text editors